Treaty of Tartu may refer to:

 Treaty of Tartu (Estonia–Russia)
 Treaty of Tartu (Finland–Russia)

See also
 Treaty of Dorpat, a Russo-Swedish treaty of 1564